Heroes United is a series of direct-to-video films from Marvel Animation and the first from its own studio outside any joint ventures.

Iron Man and Hulk

Iron Man and Hulk: Heroes United is a direct to video animated film by Marvel Animation. The film is the first long form of animation for Marvel since its Marvel Universe TV block and was targeted to children. The film stars Adrian Pasdar as Iron Man, Fred Tatasciore as Hulk / Bruce Banner, and Dee Bradley Baker as Zzzax. The film was released on Digital, Blu-ray, DVD and Disney Movies Anywhere on December 3, 2013.

The studio used a new process that they invented referred to as a "2-D wrap". This process starts with traditional animation then scanning into the computer to wrap it around the "characters to give texture and weight to backgrounds and strongly emphasize facial expressions."

History
In October 2012, Marvel Animation Studios announced its first DTV production, a direct to video film, Iron Man & Hulk: Heroes United, which was scheduled to be released on April 23, 2013. The release was pushed back to December 2013. The film's reviews were not favorable.

Plot

Two Hydra scientists enlist the Abomination to help them capture the Hulk and siphon his gamma energy into their own version of Tony Stark's arc reactor. By the time Iron Man arrives to investigate, he and the Hulk find themselves facing the newly created energy creature Zzzax. They also fight a Wendigo and a fleet of Mandroids.

Disc extras
Marvel Team-Ups Discussion
Marvel Mashups

Iron Man and Captain America

Iron Man and Captain America: Heroes United is a digital animated film by Marvel Animation. The film was released on Digital HD, On-Demand, and Disney Movies Anywhere on July 29, 2014. It stars Adrian Pasdar as Iron Man, and Roger Craig Smith as Captain America. It is currently unknown if there will be a Blu-ray and DVD release of the film.

Production history
The film was in production as of December 2013 as they released a clip of film with an announcement that the film would be released in 2014.

Plot
The Red Skull and Taskmaster strategized a plan to be rid of Captain America; by stealing the weapons that belonged to Iron Man.

After the two heroes' training was complete, the Hydra soldiers infiltrated the Helicarrier and headed towards the weapons vault. During their attack, two of the soldiers went in and escaped with the Stark Repulsor Cannon. Iron Man flies to reclaim his repulsor cannon while Cap fights with Taskmaster, but to no avail as Taskmaster takes him down and kidnapped him to the base.

The Red Skull stole Cap's superhuman blood to create an army, replicated with the same powers as he has, with machine called the Neurotransducer. Iron Man has been reported that not only the hull of the Helicarrier is damaged, but his Mark VI armor is taken by Taskmaster during the infiltration. He found their base in an abandoned military bunker in the Southern Estonia.

The serum was fully created and the Red Skull brainwashed Cap, causing him turn into a pawn called Captain Hydra and fights against Iron Man who arrives to rescue him. During the fight, Cap hacks into Iron Man's systems, allowing Taskmaster to gain access to control his Mark VI armor. Iron Man gets Cap back to normal and put up a fake fight to make Taskmaster thinks Cap is still in Hydra's control. After that, Taskmaster announced his plan to Cap about overthrowing Red Skull and to rule the world, before being beaten down by the two. As they leave, Taskmaster escapes and activates his Mark VI armor, naming himself the "Iron Master."

Arriving in Antarctica, two of the Avengers witnessed a giant rocket, containing Cap's blood, enough to turn everyone in the world into his super-powered army, and an underground facility where they mass produced the Stark Repulsor Cannon and copied Cap's shield from the real one. They fight off against the remaining Hydra soldiers and shut down production of the facility. Before they can take down the Red Skull, the Iron Master arrives and attempts to kill him, but the Iron Master's armor was in the Red Skull's control and forced him to kill them, but is quickly beaten. The superhuman Hydra soldiers arrived to defeat the two avengers. Before they can finish them off, the Hulk arrived to their aid of assistance. Iron Man fights against the Iron Master with the Hulk and won, while Cap goes to confront the Red Skull and to halt the rocket's launch sequence. Cap succeeds in stopping the rocket by stuck his shield into the fuel tanks, causing the rocket to destruct by the launch, and destroying the whole facility in the process. The Red Skull, the Iron Master and the remaining Hydra soldiers survived and escaped, but taken into custody by S.H.I.E.L.D.

At the Helicarrier, Iron Man, Cap (as Iron Patriot) and the Hulk began training and end up with the two being beaten by Iron Patriot's heat-seeking missiles. After the two make up, they and the Hulk went out to eat.

References

External links
Iron Man and Hulk
Marvel.com
imdb.com
RottenTomatoes.com
Iron Man and Captain America
imdb.com

Film series introduced in 2013
2010s direct-to-video animated superhero films
Animated films based on Marvel Comics
Captain America films
Animated superhero crossover films
Direct-to-video animated films
Films directed by Eric Radomski
Hulk (comics) films
Iron Man films
Marvel Animation
Marvel Entertainment franchises
Direct-to-video film series
Disney direct-to-video animated films